Each winner of the 1961 Governor General's Awards for Literary Merit was selected by a panel of judges administered by the Canada Council for the Arts.

English Language
Fiction: Malcolm Lowry, Hear Us O Lord from Heaven Thy Dwelling Place

Poetry or Drama: Robert Finch, Acis in Oxford

Non-Fiction: T. A. Goudge, The Ascent of Life

French Language
Fiction: Yves Thériault, Ashini

Non-Fiction: Jean Le Moyne, Convergences

Governor General's Awards
Governor General's Awards
Governor General's Awards